Wiedźmin (Polnish for Witcher) may refer to:

Media 
 The original title for The Witcher, a fantasy series of novels by Andrzej Sapkowski.
 Wiedźminm, the first story in the series (1990)
 The original title for The Witcher (video game), 2007
 The original title for The Hexer, a 2002 TV series based on the novels
The original title for The Hexer, the shorter 2001 film version
Wiedźmin (album), a 2001 music album with the music from The Hexer

Biology 
Wiedźmin (tree),  one of the largest elms in Europe, located in Poland